This is a list of Norwegian television related events from 2006.

Events
19 March - The Gjett hva jeg gjør host Katrine Moholt and her partner Bjørn Wettre Holthe win the first series of Skal vi danse?.
19 May - Aleksander Denstad With wins the fourth series of Idol.
22 May - Jessica Lindgren from Sweden wins the second series of the Scandinavian version of Big Brother.
24 November - The TV 2-nøttene host Kristian Ødegård and his partner Alexandra Kakourina win the second series of Skal vi danse?.

Debuts

15 January - Skal vi danse? (2006–present)

Television shows

2000s
Idol (2003-2007, 2011–present)

Ending this year
The Scandinavian version of Big Brother (2005-2006, 2014–present)

Births

Deaths

See also
2006 in Norway